Longstreth is a surname. Notable people with the surname include:
 Alec Longstreth  (born 1979), comics creator and illustrator
 Bevis Longstreth, retired lawyer and former Commissioner of the United States Securities and Exchange Commission
 David Longstreth (born 1981), American singer and musician
 Jake Longstreth (born 1977), American painter and radio personality
 Richard Longstreth (born 1946), architectural historian and a professor at George Washington University
 Thacher Longstreth (1920–2003), Republican member of the Philadelphia City Council